Legionella steigerwaltii is a Gram-negative bacterium from the genus  Legionella isolated from tap water in St. Croix on the Virgin Islands.

References

External links
Type strain of Legionella steigerwaltii at BacDive -  the Bacterial Diversity Metadatabase

Legionellales
Bacteria described in 1985